The Essex Book Festival is a literary festival that has been held across the county of Essex, United Kingdom, annually since March 1999. The festival aims to provide an opportunity for writers and the public to meet. The festival has been the host of numerous authors of international acclaim  but is mainly focused on local and British writers and critics. The events of the festival are generally held in libraries, theatres and schools or colleges and span the month of March.

The 2020 festival was directed by Ros Green with the theme Brave New World.

Notes and references

External links

 The Essex Book Festival's website
 Article from the Harlow Star about the festival 2009

Literary festivals in England
Festivals in Essex